Last in Line is an American rock band formed in Los Angeles in 2012 by former members of the original lineup of Dio. The band's name comes from the 1984 Dio album The Last in Line. Following the death of frontman Ronnie James Dio in 2010, the original lineup of drummer Vinny Appice, bassist Jimmy Bain, guitarist Vivian Campbell, and keyboardist Claude Schnell reunited along with vocalist Andrew Freeman to perform the Dio songs they originally recorded. The band released a studio album of original material without Schnell titled Heavy Crown in February 2016.

Biography

Dio origins
Former Black Sabbath members vocalist Ronnie James Dio and drummer Vinny Appice formed Dio in October 1982 in the United States with bassist Jimmy Bain and guitarist Vivian Campbell. The band released their debut album, Holy Diver in May 1983. Since Ronnie James Dio and Jimmy Bain had played keyboards on the record, they recruited keyboardist Claude Schnell for live shows in 1983 and the following Holy Diver tour. Claude Schnell would later become a full member of Dio, and the band's first recorded effort as a quintet would be 1984's The Last in Line. The band proceeded to release Sacred Heart in 1985 and The Dio E.P. in 1986 before Campbell was fired. The remaining members were joined by guitarist Craig Goldy to release Dream Evil in 1987 before the departure of Bain, Appice and Schnell. They would not play in Dio together again, however Appice would return to the band between 1993 and 1998 as well as Bain between 1999 and 2004.

Formation and live performances (2012–2016)
After the death of Ronnie James Dio in 2010, Vivian Campbell set into motion the idea of reuniting the original members of Dio for the first time since his departure from the band in 1986. The idea came to fruition when he joined Appice, Bain and Schnell for a jam session with vocalist Andrew Freeman in February 2012. In May 2012 it was announced that the group would begin performing live shows under the name Last in Line, after the first album they had released together (minus Freeman) with Dio. The band planned to play songs from the first three Dio albums: Holy Diver, The Last in Line and Sacred Heart. Rehearsals continued in the following weeks before Campbell joined Def Leppard on their 2012 Rock of Ages Tour and resumed in December.

The band's first public performance took place on August 3, 2013, at the Slidebar in Fullerton, California. Every song from Holy Diver was played in addition to five tracks from The Last in Line and two from Sacred Heart. The show was conceived as a warmup show for a four date tour of the United Kingdom starting in Campbell's hometown of Belfast, Northern Ireland on August 8 and continuing with three more shows in Britain over the next three days.

The band continued performances in the US with a show at the Vinyl, Las Vegas on October 8 as well as Ramona Mainstage in California on October 12. Campbell's former Sweet Savage bandmate Ray Haller filled in for Bain during the band's next performance at Loudpark Festival in Tokyo on October 20. During 2015, as Campbell fought his battle with Hodgkin's lymphoma and embarked on a 100 date tour with Def Leppard in support of their 2015 self-titled effort, Last in Line did not tour, instead they finished the recording of their debut album Heavy Crown.

They joined Def Leppard on their Hysteria on the High Seas concert cruise from January 21–25, 2016, and played a pre-cruise show at Magic City Casino in Miami on January 20, debuting new songs from Heavy Crown and their new keyboardist Erik Norlander. However, due to the death of bassist Jimmy Bain while on board, they only played an abbreviated tribute set on the last day. A scheduled tour for spring 2016 was cancelled due to Bain's passing. After auditioning bass players, bassist Phil Soussan joined the group for a small set of shows in April–May 2016.

Heavy Crown (2015–2016)
Last in Line began recording tracks for a new album of original material in April 2014, followed by the release of a snippet of the new track Devil in Me in June. The album, produced by former Dio bassist Jeff Pilson, was announced to have an expected release date in early 2016. On November 10, 2015, it was announced that Schnell would no longer be a part of the band, in that they wanted to retrace their footsteps in recording Holy Diver as a four-piece before Schnell became part of Dio. One week later on November 17, the band released a music video for their premiere single Devil in Me, and announced that their debut album, entitled Heavy Crown would be released on February 20, 2016. On January 24, bassist Jimmy Bain died while on Def Leppard's Hysteria on the High Seas concert cruise promoting Heavy Crown. Following his death, the band recruited Phil Soussan as its new bassist.

II (2017–present)
In March 2017, Campbell confirmed that a second album was "well underway" in an interview with Sirius XM. He stated that six songs had been written, and that the second album would be released in early 2018. The band had planned to finish it that year, but it had been pushed back due to members' existing commitments with Def Leppard and Foreigner. Jeff Pilson, the producer of the album, then announced it would be released sometime in 2019. The album's title was revealed as II in November 2018. The band retained seasoned bass player Phil Soussan for the recording of the album, which was released on February 22, 2019 via Frontiers. 

In 2022, the group issued Day in the Life, a limited-edition EP that featured the classic Beatles track of the same name. 

Their new album, Jericho, will be released on 31 March 2023 via earMUSIC. ″With Last in Line, just as we did with Dio, we cut the basic tracks live,” Vivian Campbell said. “It’s important for us to capture the energy of the syncopation of playing together in real-time, much like the energy of a live show. This record represents the best of both worlds: the spirit of an energetic band performance and the more reflective and nuanced qualities of our individual performances, too.”

Band members

Current members
Andrew Freeman – lead vocals (2012–present)
Vivian Campbell – guitar (2012–present)
Vinny Appice – drums (2012–present)
Phil Soussan – bass (2016–present)

Former members
Jimmy Bain – bass (2012–2016; his death)
Claude Schnell – keyboards (2012–2015)

Former touring members
Erik Norlander – keyboards (2015–2018)

Timeline

Discography
Extended Plays
 Day in the Life (2022)
Studio albums
 Heavy Crown (2016)
 II (2019)
 Jericho (2023)

References

External links
 

 
Heavy metal musical groups from California
Musical groups from Los Angeles
Musical groups established in 2012
2012 establishments in California
English rock music groups
Musical groups from London